Joe Worobec (born November 15, 1951) is a retired Canadian football player who played for the Edmonton Eskimos, Saskatchewan Roughriders, and Hamilton Tiger-Cats. He played college football at Drake University.

References

1951 births
Living people
American football offensive guards
Canadian football offensive linemen
American players of Canadian football
Drake Bulldogs football players
Edmonton Elks players
Hamilton Tiger-Cats players
Saskatchewan Roughriders players